The Maltese Government 2017–2022 was the Government of Malta from 9 June 2017 till 20 February 2022. The Maltese government is elected through a General Election for a five-year term. The Head of Government during the earlier period of the legislature was Joseph Muscat. On 13 January 2020, Muscat stepped down as Prime Minister and, following an earlier internal election within the party’s structures, Robert Abela was nominated and sworn in as the Head of Government for the later period of the legislature. The Labour Party won a majority following a snap election which was held on 3 June 2017. Parliament was dissolved on 20 February 2022 and the date of the election was set to 26 March 2022.

Muscat Cabinet 2017-2020

Abela Cabinet 2020-2022

References

2010s in Malta
2020s in Malta
Government of Malta
Cabinets established in 2017
2017 establishments in Malta
Cabinets disestablished in 2022
2022 disestablishments in Malta